Don Carlos Court is a bungalow court located at 374–386 S. Marengo Ave. in Pasadena, California. The court contains seven homes built around a central courtyard and walkway. The homes were designed in the Spanish Colonial Revival style and were all built with stucco facades and tiled gable roofs. The courtyard includes a decorative birdbath and planter. Contractor Clarence Hudson Burrell built the court in 1927.

The court was added to the National Register of Historic Places on July 11, 1983.

References

External links

Bungalow courts
Houses in Pasadena, California
Houses completed in 1927
Houses on the National Register of Historic Places in California
National Register of Historic Places in Pasadena, California
Spanish Colonial Revival architecture in California